Georgie Rankin (born 28 January 1998) is an Australian rules footballer with the Geelong Football Club in the AFL Women's (AFLW).

Rankin was born and grew up in Geelong, Victoria before moving to Gold Coast, Queensland. A basketballer with the Gold Coast Rollers in the Queensland Basketball League, Rankin switched to football in 2018 and was part of the inaugural Surfers Paradise women's team. She was then recruited by Geelong as a cross-code rookie prior to the club's inaugural season in the AFLW, and made her AFLW debut during the first round of the 2019 season, against Collingwood at GMHBA Stadium.

Rankin's great-great-grandfather, Teddy, as well as three of his sons Cliff, Doug and Bert, all played for Geelong in the then Victorian Football League (VFL).

References

External links 

Geelong Football Club (AFLW) players
1998 births
Living people
Sportswomen from Victoria (Australia)
Georgie
Australian women's basketball players
Australian rules footballers from Geelong